Metta Permadi (born April 11, 1989) is an Indonesian soap-opera actress of Chinese descent. She is the only child of Ahim Permadi and Lanida Haryono.

Career
Permadi's career in entertainment started in 2003 when she auditioned for a teen model magazine while she was in junior high school. She passed initial selection, and reached the top 40 models.

Filmography

Film

Video clip

References 
 
 

1989 births
Actresses from Jakarta
Indonesian people of Chinese descent
Indonesian television actresses
Living people